The 1990 CONCACAF Champions' Cup was the 26th edition of the annual international club football competition held in the CONCACAF region (North America, Central America and the Caribbean), the CONCACAF Champions' Cup. It determined that year's club champion of association football in the CONCACAF region and was played from 31 March 1990 till 12 March 1991.

The teams were split in three zones (North, Central and Caribbean), each one qualifying the winner to the final tournament, where the winners of the North and Central zones played a semi-final to decide who was going to play against the Caribbean champion in the final.

Mexican club América easily defeat Cuban side Pinar del Río 7–1 on aggregate, winning their third CONCACAF trophy.

North American Zone

First round 

 St. Petersburg Kickers advanced to second round.

Second round 

 Played over one leg.  América advanced to the CONCACAF Final Series.

Central American Zone

First round 

|}
Both matches awarded 2-0 to Olimpia by forfeit Juventus
All clubs in BOLD advance to the second round.

Second round 

|}
Luis Ángel Firpo, Real C.D. España and C.D. Olimpia advance to the third round.

Third round 

|}
Olimpia advance to the CONCACAF Semifinal Series.

Caribbean Zone

Preliminary round 

|}
Zénith advance to the first round.

First round 

|}
Apparently RC Rivière-Pilote withdrew.*
All clubs in BOLD advance to the second round.

Second round 

|}
Results unknown after second round, but Excelsior and Transvaal were eliminatedand Pinar del Río, advance to the CONCACAF Semifinal Series.
 Pinar del Río - (qualified) Transvaal - (Eliminated) Excelsior - (Eliminated)

Semi-finals 

1st leg: Nov. 12, 1990 at San Jose, California – (USA)2nd leg: Nov. 14, 1990 at Santa Ana, California – (USA)

|}

Final

First

Second leg 

América won 3–1 on points (8–2 on aggregate).

Champion

References

CONCACAF Champions' Cup
c
1